Tamijia flagellaris is the only species within the genus Tamijia. It is part of the family Zingiberaceae (the ginger family).

Distribution
It is native to Brunei and Malaysia.

Habitat and ecology
Typically found in drier soil that most plants in the ginger family. It is most abundant in shaded and closed canopy environments.

Description
It contains a poorly developed pseudostem and can contain 2 to 7 leaves on each shoot. The leaves are obliquely and narrowly obovate, they are arranged distichously. There are small hairs on the apex and near the midrib on the bottom side of its leaves, other than these small hairs the leaves are glabrous on both sides. The apex of the leaves are acute and the base is attenuate. The petiole can reach 6–17 cm in length and is also glabrous.

Flowers and fruit
Most commonly it has radial inflorescence, but it also rarely has terminal inflorescence.

Usage

Food
It is edible.

References

Zingiberaceae
Zingiberaceae genera
Monotypic Zingiberales genera